Ballina is a town in the Northern Rivers region of New South Wales, Australia, and the seat of the Ballina Shire local government area. Ballina's urban population at 2021 was 46,190. The town lies on the Richmond River and serves as a gateway to Byron Bay.

History
Ballina is located on the ancestral land of the Bundjalung people, the original inhabitants. Archaeological evidence demonstrates Bundjalung occupation of the region for at least 6000 years. One view suggests that the name Ballina comes from corruption of a clan name for the Bullina band of the Arakwal. It has been argued that in this tribe's Bundjalung language,  meant "place of many oysters". This theory argues that the Aboriginal name reminded the predominantly Irish settlers of "Ballina", so the name's origin could be an accidental or deliberate corruption. Another view is that town's name comes from the Irish placename Ballina (Béal an Átha, "mouth of the ford"), which is found in several parts of Ireland.

Ballina was established in the 1840s on the northern shore of the Richmond River, 20 kilometres south of Cape Byron, Australia's most easterly point. HMS Rainbow, commanded by Capt. Henry Rous, first sailed into the Richmond River in 1828, followed by overland settlers from the Clarence River. In 1842, more settlers arrived on a ship called Sally, forming a settlement at what is now East Ballina on Shaws Bay. A lighthouse, Richmond River Light, was first constructed in Ballina in 1866, which served as a significant port in the region. The temporary lighthouse was replaced with the current one, designed by James Barnet, in 1879, and first lit in 1880. It is still active. A branch railway line connected Ballina with the Murwillumbah railway line railway at Booyong. The line was opened on 24 August 1930 and closed on 12 January 1949.

Landfalls

Ballina has a number of famous "landfalls" associated with it. In 1928, Charles Kingsford Smith's plane, the Southern Cross, crossed the coast over Ballina after its epic journey across the Pacific Ocean. Ballina had a festival associated with the event during the 1970s and 1980s, and a school in East Ballina bears the name "Southern Cross".

In 1973, the Las Balsas rafts were towed into Ballina by fishing trawlers after their journey from Ecuador. One of the rafts is preserved in the Ballina Naval and Maritime Museum. They had planned to arrive in Mooloolaba in Queensland, but currents forced them off their course. Their journey was almost twice as long as the Kon-Tiki expeditions of 1947 and proved that people could have travelled across the Pacific in ancient times.

Heritage listings 
Ballina has a number of heritage-listed sites, including:
 37 Norton Street: Brundah

Location
Ballina is a coastal town and is connected to the Pacific Highway which now bypasses it.

The Richmond River was an important transport route for the region for the first 100 years after settlement. The river and its estuaries abound with marine wildlife and provide for recreational fishing and water sports.

Demographics
The population of Ballina township was 18,532 at the 2021 Census  (representing 40 percent of the Ballina Shire population of 46,296).   The urban area had a population of 46,190, which includes Lennox Head and other suburban areas.

Aboriginal and Torres Strait Islander people made up 3.3% of the population; compared with the national and state average of 2.9%.

The most common ancestries in the area were English 31.2%, Australian 28.3%, Irish 10.9%, Scottish 8.7% and German 3.2%. 81.0% of people were born in Australia. The next most common countries of birth were England 3.4%, New Zealand 1.7%, Scotland 0.5% and South Africa 0.4%. 13.3% of people had both parents born overseas. 88.7% of people only spoke English at home.

The most common responses for religion in the area were No Religion 30.2%, Catholic 23.0% and Anglican 19.6%.

Economy

The median household income was estimated to be A$1,093 per week; with the median mortgage repayments estimated at A$1,733 per month; and median rent estimated at A$345 per week. The average number of motor vehicles was 1.6 per dwelling.

Ballina serves as a tourism gateway to the close by destinations of Lismore and Byron Bay. The town has access to several beaches, such as Shelley's Beach, and to historical sites such as the Ballina Manor and the Ballina Naval and Maritime Museum, however its most famous landmark is undoubtedly the 'Big Prawn'.

The Big Prawn 

Ballina is home to the world's largest prawn model (made of concrete and fibreglass). On 24 September 2009, Ballina Shire Council voted to allow the demolition of the Big Prawn, but this permission was never acted upon. Bunnings Warehouse purchased the site and refurbished the Prawn as part of the redevelopment.  The Prawn now sits on a stand next to the entrance of the Bunnings Warehouse car park. In March 2018, Google Maps' facial recognition software blurred out the facial area of the Prawn, first noticed on Reddit Australia, and later reported in The Sydney Morning Herald.

Climate
The town of Ballina experiences a humid subtropical climate (Koppen Cfa), typical of the central part of Australia's eastern coast. Ballina's annual precipitation total observes a considerably higher concentration in the first half of the year (January–June) than the second half of the year (July–December). Ballina's wetness is due to the town's coastal location and proximity to Cape Byron, the easternmost point in Australia, which means that exposure to moisture-laden frontal systems that develop throughout the year in the Tasman Sea follows accordingly. Ballina experiences a copious  of precipitation annually, which is one of the highest annual precipitation levels to be found along the eastern coast of Australia south of the tropical coast of northern Queensland.

Media
The Northern Rivers Echo is a free weekly community newspaper with 27,000 copies distributed to Lismore, Alstonville, Wollongbar, Ballina, Casino, Nimbin and Evans Head. The Northern Star is a tabloid newspaper based in Lismore. It covers the region from Casino to Ballina and up to Murwillimbah and Byron Bay, covering a population of several hundred thousand. 

Ballina receives TV channels from SBS and ABC and the regional affiliates of Seven, Nine and WIN Television’s 10 Northern NSW.

The commercial radio stations in the area are Triple Z (Hit Music) and 2LM 900 AM. Both are run by Broadcast Operations Group. The community radio station is Paradise FM 101.9. Other radio stations are Triple J 96.1 FM, ABC Radio National 96.9 FM, ABC Classic FM 95.3 and ABC North Coast 94.5 FM.

Facilities
There are four high schools in the town (Emmanuel Anglican College, Richmond Christian College, Ballina Coast High School and Xavier Catholic College), five primary schools (Ballina Public School, Emmanuel Anglican College, Holy Family Catholic Primary School, Richmond Christian College, St. Francis Xavier Primary School and Southern Cross School), a hospital and aged care facilities.

Transport

Ballina bypass
The long-awaited Ballina bypass project upgraded 12.4 km of dual carriageway road, extending from south of Ballina at the intersection of the Bruxner and Pacific Highways to north of Ballina at the intersection with Ross Lane at Tintenbar. Twelve kilometres of local roads were also upgraded.

Early works started in April 2008 and substantial works on 16 June 2008. The Cumbalum to Ross Lane section opened in 2011 (the bypass was extended an extra 0.5 km to allow for a better connection to the Tintenbar to Ewingsdale Project) with full completion in mid-2012. The project had its final traffic switch opened to the public in April 2012, allowing for separation of the Pacific Highway and the Bruxner Highway traffic.

Airport
It has links to Newcastle, Melbourne and Sydney with FlyPelican, Jetstar, Regional Express Airlines and Virgin Australia operating services. The airport is a 30-minute road trip to Byron Bay and 40 minutes to Lismore. In 2005 Ballina Airport was renamed the Ballina Byron Gateway airport in a bid to attract more people to the area.

Sports and recreation
The Ballina Seagulls is the local rugby league club that competes in the Northern Rivers Regional Rugby League competition.

The Ballina Seahorses is the rugby union club that competes in the Far North Coast Rugby zone.

There is also a cricket competition with clubs such as the Ballina Bears and Tintenbar-East Ballina competing at both the district and regional (LJ Hooker League) level.

Notable people
 Mitchell Aubusson, Sydney Roosters NRL player 
 Simon Baker, actor
 Dustin Clare, actor
 Nathan Crosswell, basketball player
 Declan Curran, rugby union player
 Dustin Dollin, professional skateboarder 
 George Martin, mayor of Ballina
 Hunter Poon, cricketer
 Kerry Saxby-Junna Saxby competed with the Ballina Athletic Club; the "Kerry Saxby Pathway" runs past the Olympic Pool and Waterslide to the Naval and Maritime Museum

Twin cities
Ballina is twinned with:
 Ballina, County Mayo, Ireland
 Matamata-Piako District, Waikato, New Zealand

Gallery

See also
MV Limerick (1925)

References

External links

 

 Ballina Shire Council

 
Towns in New South Wales
Northern Rivers
Populated places established in 1866
1866 establishments in Australia
Ballina Shire